Vilde Johansen (born 25 July 1994) is a Norwegian handball player who plays for Herning-Ikast Håndbold.

She made her debut for Norway women's national handball team on 24 July 2015, against Russia.

Achievements
Olympic Games:
Bronze: 2020
Norwegian Championship:
Winner: 2013/2014, 2014/2015, 2015/2016 (Larvik)
Bronze medalist: 2018/2019 (Tertnes)
Norwegian Cup:
Winner: 2013, 2014, 2015, 2016
Danish Cup:
Winner: 2019

Individual awards
 All-Star Line Player of Eliteserien: 2018/2019

References

External links
 
 
 Vilde Ingeborg Johansen at the Norwegian Handball Federation 
 
 

1994 births
Living people
Sportspeople from Tønsberg
Norwegian female handball players
Norwegian expatriate sportspeople in Denmark
Expatriate handball players
Handball players at the 2020 Summer Olympics
Olympic bronze medalists for Norway
Medalists at the 2020 Summer Olympics
Olympic medalists in handball
Olympic handball players of Norway
21st-century Norwegian women